Olegário Mariano Carneiro da Cunha (1889-1958) was a Brazilian poet, politician and diplomat. He was born in Recife, the son of José Mariano Carneiro da Cunha and Olegária Carneiro da Cunha. He attended primary and secondary school at Colégio Pestalozzi in his hometown, and soon moved to Rio de Janeiro. He frequented the literary circle of Olavo Bilac, Guimarães Passos, Emílio de Meneses, Coelho Neto, Martins Fontes and others. He made his literary debut at the age of 22 with the volume Angelus, published in 1911. His poetry strongly identified with the precepts of Symbolism.

He held a variety of government roles, both at home and abroad. He rose to become Brazilian ambassador to Portugal in 1953–54. But he also remained a significant literary figure. Much of his work was collected in the two volumes of Toda uma vida de Poetry (1957), published by José Olímpio. In a contest promoted by the Fon-Fon magazine, in 1938, he was elected by intellectuals from all over Brazil as Prince of the Brazilian Poets, replacing Alberto de Oliveira, who had held the title since the death of Olavo Bilac. He was also known as the “poet of cicadas”, because it was one of his favorite themes. He wrote for many years in the magazines Careta and Para Todos, under the pseudonym of João da Avenida.

Mariano was the third occupant of Chair 21 of the Brazilian Academy of Letters, to which he was elected on December 23, 1926, succeeding Mário de Alencar and received by Academician Gustavo Barroso on April 20, 1927. He in turn received Academician Guilherme de Almeida.

References

1889 births
1958 deaths
Brazilian poets
People from Recife